Sherwood is a suburb in the City of Brisbane, Queensland, Australia.

Geography 

Oxley Road is the main thoroughfare through the suburb, entering from the north (Graceville) and exiting to the south (Corinda). The Ipswich railway line runs parallel to and west of Oxley Avenue, with the suburb served by Sherwood railway station.

The suburb is mostly low and medium-density housing with a retail strip centred along Sherwood Road.

History 
West Oxley State School opened on 25 March 1867. It  was renamed Sherwood State School in 1878. The first head teacher was Major William Jenyns Boyd. He was born in Paris in 1842 and migrated to Australia in 1862. In 1868, Oliver Radcliffe was the first name on the roll as a pupil teacher. He became a teacher, a headmaster and then a school inspector. By his retirement in 1932, he was the Chief Inspector for the Queensland Education Department. He personally inspected schools from Coolangatta to Thursday Island and from Rockhampton to the border with South Australia.

In 1879, the local government area of Yeerongpilly Division was created. In 1891 parts of Yeerongpilly Division were excised to create Sherwood Division becoming a Shire in 1903 which contained the suburb of Sherwood. In 1925, the Shire of Sherwood was amalgamated into the City of Brisbane. 

On 24 October 1885, auctioneer John F. Buckland offered 268 suburban blocks (mostly 16 perches) in the Township of Sherwood Estate. Most of the blocks were in the area bounded by Oxley Road to the west, Sherwood Road to the north and the  Corinda–Yeerongpilly railway line to the south-east. The remaining blocks were south of the railway line on Railway Terrace. However, only about 40 blocks were sold. On 23 June 1888 auctioneer John F. Buckland offered the remaining 200 suburban blocks  in the Township of Sherwood Estate.

Sherwood Methodist Church was built in 1914. It was designed  by Walter Taylor and built from concrete. Following the amalgamation that created the Uniting Church in Australia in 1977, it became known as Sherwood Uniting Church. A Sunday School hall was opened on Saturday 29 June 1918.

On Saturday 17 March 1928, Herbert Hoare in conjunction with auctioneer Norman C. Cosssart offered 8 suburban sites in the Sherwood Station Estate, which was bounded by Dewar Terrace to the west, Station Street (now Marlborough Street) to the north and Honour Avenue to the west (and north of Lilly Street). The land was formerly the home of judge Pope Alexander Cooper who died in 1923.

Sherwood was badly flooded in February 1931.

The median age of the Sherwood population was 35 years, three years below the Australian median.  71.2% of people living in Sherwood were born in Australia, similar to the national average of 66.7%. The other top responses for country of birth were England 5.0%, New Zealand 2.5%, India 1.9%, South Korea 0.9%, China (excluding SARs and Taiwan) 0.8%.  82.3% of people spoke only English at home; other languages include 1.3% Mandarin, 1.0% Korean, 0.8% Spanish, 0.7% Persian, 0.7% Hindi.

Heritage listings

Sherwood has a number of heritage-listed sites, including:

 57 Dewar Terrace: John Herbert Memorial Vista
 22 Ettie Street: 22 Ettie Street, Sherwood (also known as Mayfield)
 9 Hazelmere Parade: Hazelmere
 40 Hazelmere Parade: 40 Hazelmere Parade Sherwood
 47 Hazelmere Parade: 47 Hazelmere Parade, Sherwood (also known as The Terrace)
 62 Kitchener Street: 62 Kitchener Street, Sherwood
 25 Lahey Close: Lahey's Corinda Sawmill
 36 Lilly Street: Dunalister (also known as Sherwood Private Hospital)
 56 Lilly Street: 56 Lilly Street, Sherwood (also known as Benaraby)
 31 Linda Street: 31 Linda Street, Sherwood
 464 Oxley Road: Sherwood State School
 481 Oxley Road: St Matthew's Anglican Church
 515 Oxley Road: former Sherwood Presbyterian Church (also known as Sherwood Uniting Church)
 526 Oxley Road: Shop & Residence
 46 Primrose Street: Almaden
 533 Sherwood Road: Berry & MacFarlane Monument
 533 Sherwood Road: Sherwood Anglican Cemetery (also known as St. Matthew's Cemetery)
 706 Sherwood Road: Uniting Church
 34 Thallon Street: Hives Park (includes park, scout & guide huts & kindergarten)
 39A Turner Street: Sherwood Arboretum, a large botanical garden and lake fronting the river which was planned and landscaped in the 1920s.

Education 
Sherwood State School is a government primary (Prep-6) school for boys and girls at 464 Oxley Road. In 2018, the school had an enrolment of 586 students with 41 teachers (34 full-time equivalent) and 31 non-teaching staff (17 full-time equivalent). The school has preserved many of its historic timber buildings.

There is no secondary school in Sherwood. The nearest government secondary school is Corinda State High School in neighbouring Corinda to the south.

Amenities 

There are a number of cafes, both a  BWS and Liquorland liquor store, a fitness center, a Bank of Queensland branch, op shops, and a Woolworths supermarket.

There are a number of churches in Sherwood, including:
 St Matthew's Anglican Church, 497 Oxley Road (corner of Sherwood Road)
 Sherwood Uniting Church, 706 Sherwood Road (corner of Thallon Street)
 Sherwood Methodist Church with services in English and Mandarin, 405 Oxley Road
 Sherwood Romanian Seventh-day Adventist Church, 551 Sherwood Road

Sherwood contains a few parks in different parts of the suburb. The Sherwood Arboretum is on the western side of the suburb, bordering the Brisbane River. Hives park borders the Ipswich line on the southern end of the suburb, and contains a Girl Guides building. Thomas Street Park and Strickland Terrace Park is on the eastern end of the suburb, bordering the Oxley Creek. The Stewart Franklin Park is a small park on the southern border of the suburb, next to the Tennyson line.

The Sherwood Sharks swimming club uses the Sherwood State School Pool.

Transport

The suburb is serviced by the Sherwood railway station which links Ipswich and the Springfield Central lines to the Brisbane central business district. Bus services along Oxley Road link the Centenary suburbs to Indooroopilly and the Great Circle Line service passes through the suburb.

References

Further reading

External links

 Brisbane Suburb Home: Sherwood via the Way Back Machine

 
Suburbs of the City of Brisbane